Wing Commander: Armada is a computer game set in the universe of Chris Roberts' Wing Commander franchise. Created by Origin Systems and distributed by Electronic Arts in 1994, Armada was the first official game of the Wing Commander series to feature multiplayer mode. This game was released shortly before Wing Commander III: Heart of the Tiger and features a new graphics engine, capable of rendering fully 3D ship models, which is more powerful than the sprite-based engine used in Wing Commander II: Vengeance of the Kilrathi.

Gameplay
Armada features single-player and multiplayer modes. In single player, the player fights the computer-controlled opponents in a number of different game types, whereas multiplayer mode allows two players to play the various game modes head-to-head or cooperatively.

Game modes

Battle
Available only in multiplayer mode, this game type consists of a head-to-head dogfight between two players. Each player chooses one of the fighters available from those of the Confed and Kilrathi inventory, then the fights begin. The player who destroys the opponent is the winner.

Gauntlet
This game type is very much like the "Gauntlet" feature from Wing Commander: Academy and is available both in single-player and multiplayer. Two players cooperatively fight computer-controlled ships. The player or players side with either the Terran Confederation or the Kilrathi Empire, then play through 15 levels, each consisting of three separate waves of enemy fighters; as the "Gauntlet" progresses, the enemy ships' strength, number and skill increase. The game ends when the player(s) beat the last wave, or a player's ship is destroyed (in multiplayer the game ends if either player is destroyed). Unlike Academy, where the player could choose which fighter to fly in the "Gauntlet", in Armada the player starts flying either the Arrow or the Dralthi light fighter, then moves to medium and heavy fighters as the game progresses.

One feature was not present in the retail version of Armada but could be enabled by installing a patch released by Origin on their website. The new feature provided each level with a code, enabling the player to restart the "Gauntlet" from the level corresponding to the code, without the requirement to play through all the previous waves.

Armada
This is the main game type featured in Armada, available both in single-player (player vs. computer) and multiplayer (player vs. player). Armada is a strategy driven game type taking place in a randomly generated sector of space which is depicted in the game's main screen: dots indicate star systems connected through one or more line representing the available space lanes for starships. The players choose a side (Confederation or Kilrathi) to play with and begin with their forces placed on the opposite sides of the sector.

Since both sides start with a carrier and a complement of two light fighters, players can build mines on the planets they visit to gather resources with which to build shipyards for more fighters or fortresses to defend specific planets. Action takes place in turns. During their turns, players can move their ships or build mines/shipyards/fortresses, while the other player waits. The game ends when one player is able to locate the opponent's carrier and attack it with heavy fighters: if the assault is successful a cinematic of the carrier blowing up is displayed and the game ends.

Campaign
The "Campaign" mode is very much like the "Armada" game type and consists of 11 scenarios played following the same rules as "Armada". To progress to the next level, one of the two sides must be defeated by destroying its carrier. At the end of the last level, depending on the points gathered during all the matches, one side is the overall winner and a cinematic of either Earth or Kilrah blowing up is shown. The "Campaign" can be played both in single-player and multiplayer.

Reception
Next Generation reviewed the PC version of the game, rating it three stars out of five, and stated that "if you've been looking to play - with or against a friend - a title worth owning, wait for Wing Commander 3".

Reviews
Power Play (Jul, 1994)
MikroBitti (Dec, 1994)

References

 Paul Pettengale "Wing Commander: Armada", PC Format magazine, September 1994
 Paul Galancey "Wing Commander: Armada", PC Review magazine, November 1994
 Wing Commander: Armada Play Guide
 Wing Commander: Armada "Voices of War" manual

External links
Wing Commander: Armada at MobyGames

1994 video games
DOS games
FM Towns games
Games commercially released with DOSBox
NEC PC-9801 games
Science fiction video games
Space combat simulators
Video games developed in the United States
Video games with expansion packs
Wing Commander (franchise)